Mesothen flavicostata is a moth of the subfamily Arctiinae. It was described by Herbert Druce in 1906. It is found in Peru.

References

 

Mesothen (moth)
Moths described in 1906